Eupithecia ochracea is a moth in the  family Geometridae. It is found from India and Pakistan to south-west China.

References

Moths described in 1888
ochracea
Moths of Asia